The 1901 Victorian Football League finals series was the 5th annual edition of the VFL final series, the Australian rules football tournament staged to determine the premier of the 1901 VFL season. The series ran over two weekends in August and September 1901, culminating with the 1901 VFL Grand Final at the Lake Oval on 7 September 1901.

The system used for this final series was First Argus system. The system was only used once.

Ladder

Semi-final

1st Semi-final

2nd Semi-final

Grand final

References 

1901 in Australian rules football
Australian Football League